Alexandra Cheatle (born 6 June 1994), known by her stage name Zyra, is an English singer, songwriter and record producer.

Musical career

Breakthrough
In July 2014, Cheatle adopted the alias Zyra. The following month, she featured as a guest vocalist on a number of tracks she had written for the sophomore release from Seattle production duo, Odesza. "Say My Name" peaked at number 2 on the iTunes US electronic charts as an initial single release, while the album, In Return quickly reached the top of the US electronic album chart, peaking at 20 in the main chart.

Awards
Cheatle became the youngest person ever to receive a Make It Break It Songwriting Award in October 2009, winning the UK national songwriting competition The Make It Break It Awards (formerly known as The National Youth Rock and Pop Awards). The judging panel of industry professionals who chose Alex's song 'People Talk About Us' as their winner included; Coldplay's Chris Martin, record producer Steve Levine, and Guy Moot. Chris Martin of Coldplay is among the competitions alumni winners. On 7 December 2015 "Say My Name (RAC Remix) ft. Zyra" was nominated for a Grammy.

Discography

Albums

Singles

Featured singles

References

External links

1994 births
Living people
English women singer-songwriters
English record producers
21st-century English women singers
21st-century English singers
British women record producers
People from Leicester